Lukáš Wagenknecht (born 24 September 1978) is a Czech economist, auditor and politician serving as a Senator of the Czech Republic representing Prague 8 district since October 2018. He is a member of the Czech Pirate Party. Wagenknecht also co-founded the auditing organization and think tank Good Governance and was a contributor to Neovlivní.cz, a publisher of investigative journalism.

Political beginnings
Lukáš Wagenknecht was born on 24 September 1978 in Pardubice, northern-central Czech Republic. He studied at the Faculty of Economics and Administration of the University of Pardubice from 1998 to 2003 and subsequently started his professional career as an internal auditor at the Ministry of the Interior, in 2003.

From February 2014 to June 2015, Wagenknecht served as the first Deputy Minister of Finance of the Czech Republic in the field of financial management and audit. In 2015, he received the Prize for Courage for whistleblowing from the Anticorruption Endowment foundation.
Wagenknecht co-founded the auditing organization and think tank Good Governance and since January 2018, he is a contributor to Neovlivní.cz, a publisher of investigative journalism.

Senator
Wagenknecht was elected a Member of the Senate of the Czech Republic for the Czech Pirate Party in the 2018 election. In October 2019, Wagenknecht "launched legal action at the European Court of Justice after the European Council failed to respond to his concerns about the alleged conflict of interest" of the acting Prime Minister of the Czech Republic, Andrej Babiš. Wagenknecht also investigated the alleged subsidy fraud of Prime Minister Babiš.

References

External links
 
 Lukáš Wagenknecht official website
 Lukáš Wagenknecht on Czech Pirate Party website
 Lukáš Wagenknecht on Neovlivní.cz

1978 births
21st-century Czech politicians
21st-century Czech economists
Czech Pirate Party Senators
Czech whistleblowers
Government audit officials
Living people
Writers from Pardubice
Politicians from Pardubice